Chasing Red is a 2015 documentary film about the 2012 Festival of San Fermín in Pamplona, Spain. The film directed by Dennis Clancey.

Chasing Red won Best of the Fest Grand Jury Prize at the 2015 LA Indie Film Festival.

Synopsis 
The film focuses on four runners at the running of the bulls including the director himself, Dennis Clancey, as well as acclaimed author Bill Hillmann and the well-recognized Spanish runner, David Ubeda. In total, four runners brave eight runs despite injury and risk.

References

External links 
 
 
 

2015 films
2015 documentary films
American documentary films
Spanish documentary films
2012 in Spain
2010s English-language films
2010s American films